Julio Javier Marchant (born 11 January 1980 in Santiago del Estero) is an Argentine retired footballer.

Career
He made his debut playing for Boca Juniors in 2000, where he won the Copa Libertadores 2000. Two years later, he lost his place in the squad, transferring to Racing Club the next year.

After his spell in Racing, Marchant was transferred once again to Union de Santa Fé, playing in the Nacional B, second division of Argentine football. He then moved to Portugal, playing 2 years for CD Nacional.

The first half of 2007 saw the midfielder transferring to Mexican side Necaxa, which signed him to play for the team in the 2007 Copa Libertadores.

He then made a move to Uruguay to play for Defensor Sporting in the second half of 2007. With Defensor Sporting he won the 2008 Uruguayan Championship.

In 2009, he returned to Argentina to play for Banfield where he was a key member of the squad that won the Apertura 2009 championship appearing in 17 of their 19 games. On 13 December 2009 he celebrated with his team mates when Banfield won the Argentine championship for the first time in the history of the club.

Honours
Boca Juniors
Primera División Argentina: Apertura 2000
Copa Libertadores (2): 2000, 2001
Copa Intercontinental: 2000

Defensor Sporting Club
Primera División Uruguaya: 2008

Banfield
Primera División Argentina: Apertura 2009

External links
 Argentine Primera statistics
 Article about his career
 Julio Marchant at BDFA

1980 births
Living people
People from Santiago del Estero
Argentine footballers
Argentine people of French descent
Boca Juniors footballers
Racing Club de Avellaneda footballers
Unión de Santa Fe footballers
Club Necaxa footballers
Defensor Sporting players
Primeira Liga players
C.D. Nacional players
Club Atlético Banfield footballers
América de Cali footballers
Chacarita Juniors footballers
Argentine Primera División players
Uruguayan Primera División players
Categoría Primera A players
Argentine expatriate footballers
Expatriate footballers in Colombia
Expatriate footballers in Mexico
Expatriate footballers in Portugal
Expatriate footballers in Uruguay
Association football midfielders
Sportspeople from Santiago del Estero Province